The Baltimore City Delegation refers to the 18 delegates who are elected from districts in Baltimore to serve in the Maryland House of Delegates in the United States.  There are currently 6 legislative districts in Baltimore City with each having 3 delegates. The chairman of the delegation is chosen via an open ballot by the members of the delegation and usually serves for four years.  The delegation usually meets weekly during the regular session of the Maryland General Assembly in the Baltimore City Delegation Room of the Lowe House Office Building in Annapolis.  During the legislative interim, May through December, the delegation meets on an as needed basis.

Authority and responsibilities

The Baltimore City Delegation is responsible for representing the interests, needs and concerns of the City of Baltimore in the Maryland General Assembly.  The first priority has been to ensure that sufficient state funds are granted to the city to support the funding of education and the construction and operation of public school facilities.  Additionally, the delegation monitors state transportation trust funds allocated to the city for its transportation infrastructure.  Every year, the Mayor of Baltimore provides of list of special projects that need to be funded through state loans (bonds); the Baltimore City Senate Delegation is responsible for passage of those projects in the General Assembly.

Maryland General Assembly legislative session actions

During the 90-day session of the 2007 Maryland General Assembly, members of the delegation received briefings from:
 Baltimore City Public School System (BCPSS)
 Mayor Sheila Dixon
 Mayor's Office of Government Relations
 Michael Busch, Speaker of the House
 Patricia Jessamy, State's Attorney for Baltimore City
 Governor Martin O’Malley
 Lori Albin, Office of the Public Defender
 Leonard Hamm, Police Commissioner of Baltimore City
 Dr. Joshua Sharfstein, Health Commissioner of Baltimore City
 William Somerville, Ethics Counsel
 Doug Gansler, Attorney General of MD
 Peter Franchot, Comptroller of MD

2007 Bill hearings
The delegation also conducted hearings on more than 30 bills and voted favorably on the following:
 HB 165 – Del. Rosenberg – Baltimore City – Local Government Tort Claims Act – Baltimore Public Markets Corporation and Lexington Market, Inc.
 HB 251 – Del. Anderson (By Request – Baltimore City Administration) – Baltimore City – Property Tax Credit for Newly Constructed Dwellings
 HB 458 – Del. Tarrant – Ground Rents – Property Owned by Baltimore City – Reimbursement for Expenses – Notices
 HB 762 – Del. Anderson – Baltimore City – Housing Authority – Continued Occupancy by Family Member on Death of Tenant
 HB 813 – Del. Rosenberg – Baltimore City – Property Tax Credit – Inclusionary Housing (Favorable with Amendments)
 HB 769 – Del. Anderson – Disease Prevention – Sexually Transmitted Diseases – Expedited Partner Therapy Pilot Program
 HB 1403 – Del. Olszewski – Critical Area – Construction of a Facility – Prohibition (Favorable with Amendments)
 HB 991 – Del. Anderson (By Request – Baltimore City Administration) – Baltimore City – Hotel Room Tax – Convention Center Promotion
 HB 1167 – Del. Oaks – Baltimore City – Binding Arbitration – Police Officers (Favorable as Amended)
 HB 1017 – Del. Walker – Baltimore City and Prince George's County – Parent-Teacher Association Matching Fund Pilot Program
 SB 861 – Sen. Pugh – Task Force – Urban Senior Care Communities in Baltimore City
 SB 571 – Sen. Della – Baltimore City – 46th Alcoholic Beverages District – Licenses
 SB 16 – Sen. Della – Baltimore City – Local Government Tort Claims Act – Baltimore Public Markets Corporation and Lexington Market, Inc.
 SB 755 – Sen. Gladden – Ground Rents – Property Owned by Baltimore City – Reimbursement for Expenses – Notices (Favorable as Amended)

During the 2008 Legislative Session, the Baltimore City Delegation met for a total of 13 meetings, with the attendance of all Delegates between 90–95%.

Briefings

Throughout the 90-day Session, the Baltimore City Delegation heard from various major City agencies, which briefed the Delegation on the agencies’ 2008 Legislative Priorities.

 Dr. Andres Alonso, CEO – Baltimore City Public School System (BCPSS)
 Baltimore City Mayor's Office
 Michael Busch, Speaker of the House
 Governor Martin O’Malley
 Frederick H. Bealefeld III, Commissioner Baltimore Police Department
 Dr. Joshua Sharfstein, Health Commissioner of Baltimore City
 Doug Gansler, Attorney General of MD
 Peter Franchot, Comptroller of MD
 Lori Albin, Office of the Public Defender
 William Somerville, Ethics Counsel
 Patricia Jessamy, State's Attorney Baltimore City
 Lt. Gov. Anthony Brown

Delegation bills
The Baltimore City Delegation, with the assistance of Delegation Counsel, Karen Morgan, heard the following bills, sponsored by the Baltimore City Administration:

 HB 611 – Underground Facilities – Determination of Marking – Initial Fees (UNF)
 HB 615 – State Government – Custodian of Records – Inspection of Public Records (FAV)
 HB 768 – Children – Records – Access by the Baltimore City Health Department (Became Law)
 HB 849 – Public Safety – Restrictions on Possession of Firearms – Conviction of Disqualifying Crime and Protective Order Respondent (UNF)
 HB 880 – Public Safety – Regulated Firearms – Reporting Lost or Stolen (UNF)
 HB 900 – Criminal Procedure – Restrictions on Pretrial Release – Offenses Involving Firearms – Repeat Offenders (UNF)
 HB 964 – Criminal Procedure – No Good Time For Gun Crime (Recommitted to JUD Committee)
 HB 1441 – Baltimore City – Tax Increment Financing and Special Tax Districts – MEDCO (Became Law)

Baltimore City related bills
The Baltimore City Delegation also heard the following bills which would have either direct or indirect impact on Baltimore City:

 HB 524 – Del. Glenn – Baltimore City – Board of Education – Election of Members (UNF)
 HB 690 – Del. Rosenberg – Baltimore City – Property Tax Credit for Newly Constructed Dwellings – Hillsdale Heights Neighborhood Association Dwellings (UNF)
 HB 298 – Del. Conaway – Baltimore City Board of School Commissioners – System of Public School Buses Required (UNF)
 HB 299 – Del. Conaway – Education – Baltimore City – Public and Private Schools – Criminal Law and Criminal Procedure Courses (UNF)
 HB 1069 – Del. Conaway & Glenn – Baltimore City Circuit Court – Jury Duty – Payment to Jurors (UNF)
 HB 1258 – Del. Carter, et al. – Baltimore City Public Schools – High School Students – Voter Education (Became Law)
 HB 1283 – Del. Haynes, et al. – Baltimore City – Public School Construction – State Funding (UNF)
 HB 1507 – Del. Oaks – Baltimore City – Binding Arbitration – Police Officers (Recommitted to APP Committee)

The last Baltimore City Delegation meeting of the 2008 Legislative Session was held on Friday April 11, 2008 with the Delegation returning an Unfavorable vote for the House Bills which would change the composition of the Baltimore City School Board Commissioners.

For the 2009 Legislative Session, the Baltimore City Delegation met for a total of 10 meetings, with the attendance of all Delegates between 90–95%. Throughout the 90-day Session, the Baltimore City Delegation heard from various major City agencies, which briefed the Delegation on the agencies’ 2009 Legislative Priorities.

	Dr. Andres Alonso, CEO – Baltimore City Public School System (BCPSS)
	Baltimore City Mayor's Office
	Dept of Planning – Red Line Initiative
	Dept. Of Public Works – One+One Recycling
	Michael Busch, Speaker of the House
	Governor Martin O’Malley
	Frederick Bealefeld III, Police Commissioner of Baltimore City
	Peter Franchot, Comptroller of Maryland
	Paula Carmody, People's Counsel – Office of People's Counsel
	Senator Ben Cardin

Baltimore City administration bills
The Baltimore City Delegation, with the assistance of Delegation Counsel, Sue McNamee, heard the following bills, sponsored by the Baltimore City Administration:
	HB 87 – Crimes – Violation of Restriction Against Possession of Regulated Firearms – Penalties (UNF)
	HB 88 – Criminal Procedure – Restrictions on Pretrial Release – Offenses Involving Firearms – Repeat Offenders (Became Law)
	HB 92- Baltimore City – Authority of Mayor to Remove Police Commissioner (Became Law)
	HB 94 – Foreign Trade Zones – Application and Process (Became Law)
	HB 99 – Commercial Real Property – Action to Abate Drug Nuisance – Prior Notice Requirement (Became Law)
	HB 143- Baltimore City – Newly Constructed Dwelling Property Tax Credit – Modification and Reauthorization (Became Law)
	HB 396 – Baltimore City- Vehicle Laws – Speed Monitoring Systems (Became Law – Statewide Impact)
	SB 348 – Tax Sales – Fees (Became Law)
	SB 901 – Baltimore City Land Bank Authority – Recodification (Became Law)

Baltimore City related bills
The Baltimore City Delegation also heard the following bills which would have either direct or indirect impact on Baltimore City:

	HB 500 – Del. Tarrant, et al. – Baltimore City – Medical Assistance Programs – Eligibility and Enrollment Information Mailings to Students (Became Law)
	HB 1156 – Del. Rosenberg, et al. – Baltimore City Lead Poisoning Recovery Act of 2009 (UNF)
	HB 1008 – Del. Conaway – Education – Baltimore City – Public and Private Schools – Criminal Law and Criminal Procedure Courses (UNF)
	HB 1013 – Del. Conaway – Baltimore City – Rifles and Shotguns – Possession by a Minor Prohibited (UNF)
	HB 1031 – Del. Conaway – Baltimore City Board of School Commissioners – System of Public School Buses Required (UNF)
	HB 1091/ SB 16 – Del. Glenn/ Sen. Conway – Baltimore City and Prince George's County- Organization of Parents and Teachers – Matching Fund (Became Law)
	HB 1374 – Del. Oaks, et al. – Baltimore City School Police Officers – Baltimore City School Police Lodge Five – Employee Organization (Became Law)
	SB 983 – Sen. Conway, et al. – Baltimore City – Alcoholic Beverages – Beer, Wine and Liquor Tasting License (Became Law)

The last Baltimore City Delegation meeting of the 2009 Legislative Session was held on Friday March 27, 2009, in which the Delegation was briefed on the City Administration's initiatives on decreasing weekly trash pickup and increasing weekly recycling pickup throughout the City.

History

Chairmen of the Baltimore City Delegation (last 60 years)

Current members of the Baltimore City Delegation

Delegation subcommittees
During the first Baltimore City Delegation meeting of the 2007 Maryland General Assembly Legislative Session, the Delegation was divided into 3 Sub-Committees, to provide closer insight on issues which would directly or indirectly affect Baltimore City:

Public Safety
 Del. Talmadge Branch – Chairman
 Del. Curt Anderson
 Del. Sandy Rosenberg
 Del. Frank Conaway

Alcohol
 Del. Luke Clippinger - Chairman
 Del. Nick Mosby
 Del. Tony Bridges

Education
 Del. Brooke Lierman – Chairman
 Del. Maggie McIntosh
 Del. Keith Haynes
 Del. Robbyn Givens
 Del. Sandy Rosenberg 
 Del. Stephanie Smith

See also
 Current members of the Maryland State Senate

Notes

References

External links
 Maryland General Assembly

Delegations in the Maryland General Assembly
Government of Baltimore
Politicians from Baltimore